"Us" is the fifth track from American singer Regina Spektor's major label debut Soviet Kitsch. It was officially released as a single in 2006 for her UK compilation album Mary Ann Meets the Gravediggers and Other Short Stories by Regina Spektor. The song is notable for its use of a string quartet in addition to Spektor's usual piano and vocals. As of 2009, the single has sold 86,000 copies in United States.

Music video
This is the first Regina Spektor song to have an accompanying music video. The video used stop motion animation. It shows Spektor climbing into a dark green room and unpacking an assortment of objects from a trunk, including a piano, rug, a globe, and some seeds, which she places on the rug and grows with water. The video contains some strange scenes, such as toy soldiers coming out of Spektor's mouth, and ends with her placing everything (including herself) back into the trunk, which vanishes. The music video is a parody of Georges Méliès's silent film, The Diabolic Tenant (1909), in which a man rents an apartment and furnishes it by unpacking objects from his trunk in the same fashion Spektor does in Us. The video was directed by Adria Petty.

Use in media 
Notably, the primary piano and strings riff of the song was used in an ad supporting Democratic presidential candidate Joe Biden ahead of the 2020 United States presidential election. The song was also used in a UEFA Champions League Final montage, by ITV. This song was also used during the opening credits montage of the film (500) Days of Summer.

Releases

References

Regina Spektor songs
2006 singles
2006 songs
Sire Records singles
Songs written by Regina Spektor